Patrick Joseph "Paddy" Ryan (born December 11, 1990) is an Irish-American rugby union player who plays as a prop for the Austin Gilgronis of Major League Rugby (MLR) and the United States men's national team.

He previously played for the Newcastle Falcons in the English premiership before joining Austin Elite for the inaugural season of Major League Rugby in 2018. Ryan also played for Rugby United New York (RUNY) in Major League Rugby (MLR) in 2019 and 2020.

Family and early life
The son of an American mother, Paddy Ryan was born in Chicago, Illinois, but was raised in Ireland. 

He played club rugby for Highfield RFC and Dolphin RFC in Cork, along with his older brothers Tim Ryan and Dave Ryan, who also later became professional rugby players. 

Paddy Ryan joined the Munster Rugby academy, ultimately playing for the Munster Under-20 and Munster A sides.

Club career

Early club career

In England: Newcastle and Bath
In July 2015, Ryan signed a two-year contract to play for the Newcastle Falcons. He made seven total appearances for the club in English Premiership games across the 2015–16 and 2016–17 seasons, making one start during the 2015–16 season.

Following the end of his tenure with Newcastle, Ryan joined Bath on a trial.

MLR: Austin and New York
Ryan joined Austin Elite for their inaugural Major League Rugby season in 2018. He suffered an injury early in the season, and only made three total appearances for the club.

In late 2018, Ryan signed with Rugby United New York (RUNY) for the 2019 season, making a preseason debut with the club in December 2018.

International career
Ryan made his debut with the USA Eagles on June 10, 2017, appearing as a substitute in a mid-year test against Ireland. The Eagles lost the match by a score of 55–19.

External links
 Stats on It's Rugby

References

1990 births
Living people
American rugby union players
United States international rugby union players
Austin Gilgronis players
Rugby New York players
Rugby union props
Rugby Viadana players
London Welsh RFC players
Newcastle Falcons players
Bath Rugby players
San Diego Legion players
Chicago Hounds (rugby union) players
Irish rugby union players
American expatriate sportspeople in Italy
Irish expatriate sportspeople in Italy
American expatriate sportspeople in France
American expatriate sportspeople in England
Irish expatriate sportspeople in England
Irish expatriate sportspeople in France
Expatriate rugby union players in Italy
Expatriate rugby union players in France
Expatriate rugby union players in England
Irish expatriate rugby union players